The 1976 Australia Day Honours were announced on 26 January 1976 by the Governor General of Australia, Sir John Kerr.

The Australia Day Honours are the first of the two major annual honours lists, announced on Australia Day (26 January), with the other being the Queen's Birthday Honours which are announced on the second Monday in June.

Order of Australia

Companion (AC)

Civil Division

Military Division

Officer (AO)

Civil Division

Military Division

Member (AM)

Civil Division

Military Division

References

1976 awards
Orders, decorations, and medals of Australia
1976 in Australia